Giancarlo Baghetti (25 December 1934 – 27 November 1995) was a Formula One driver who raced for the Ferrari, Automobili Turismo e Sport, BRM, Brabham and Lotus teams.

Baghetti is one of the only drivers to have won his first World Championship race without being the winner in the very first race of its kind, like Nino Farina, who in 1950 won the first F1 World Championship race, the 1950 British Grand Prix. As the Indianapolis 500 was part of the World Championship from 1950 to 1960, but contested by different drivers and cars, the same applies to Johnnie Parsons, who won the 1950 Indianapolis 500, just 17 days after Farina.

Formula One career
Baghetti was born in Milan. His father was a wealthy Milan industrialist. He began racing in 1955 in production cars, moving up to Formula Junior in 1958. In 1961 he was selected by the Federazione Italiana Scuderie Automobilistiche (FISA), a coalition of independent Italian team owners who had agreed a loan deal with Ferrari for a 156 Formula Two car to run in non-Championship Grand Prix, giving experience to promising Italian drivers. Despite not showing spectacular form in lower categories, Baghetti was chosen over Albino Buttichi and Lucien de Sanctis for the seat. The car was first entered for the Syracuse Grand Prix, the first major event run under the new 1.5-litre championship regulations, and against a strong field Baghetti qualified second and won in the only Ferrari, with the British teams and Porsche 718 flat 4 unable to compete with the Dino's V6. He then drove the same car to win at the Napoli Grand Prix a few weeks later.

Team FISA entered an original 60-degree V6 Ferrari 156, at least 10 hp down on power, for Baghetti in the 1961 French Grand Prix at Reims-Gueux, for this World Championship event. Once Wolfgang von Trips, Richie Ginther and Phil Hill had all retired their works 156s, Baghetti was left to uphold Ferrari honour. He overcame Dan Gurney's Porsche 718 to take victory, giving him a hat trick of wins from his first three Grands Prix. The victory meant Baghetti became the first Italian since 1956 to win a Formula One World Championship event. It also ensured that he became the first, and only driver ever to win on their World Championship Grand Prix debut against a field that did not consist entirely of other debutant drivers.

He entered two more Championship races, retiring from the 1961 British Grand Prix and 1961 Italian Grand Prix, though he posted fastest lap in the latter. He also won the poorly attended Prima Coppa Italia race at Vallelunga in a Porsche 718.

He was promoted to the works Ferrari line-up for 1962, but took just two Championship placings – fourth at the Dutch Grand Prix, and fifth at the Italian Grand Prix, as Ferrari was outclassed by the British teams. Baghetti took second in the non-Championship Mediterranean Grand Prix. He was offered a  full Ferrari F1 drive for 1963, but had already signed with a rival team. Enzo Ferrari rated Baghetti highly, calling him, 'a lesser Varzi'. Baghetti was involved in 1963 in the disastrous ATS effort in 1963, joining up with Phil Hill for Carlo Chiti's breakaway team, but failed to register a finish from five starts. For 1964 he switched to Scuderia Centro Sud's outdated BRM P57 cars, peaking with seventh at the Austrian Grand Prix. His Grand Prix career was then virtually over, though he had three more one-off drives, all at the Italian Grand Prix – a works Brabham in 1965, a Reg Parnell-semiworks Dino  Ferrari 2.4 V6 in which he ran strongly ahead of  Arundell's Lotus V8 Climax and Anderson's 2.7 litre Brabham, running 5th in 1966 and a similarly competent drive in a works Lotus 49 in 1967, running in midfield and passing Amon and Ickx and would have scored a point but for a blown engine.

Post Formula One racing
He achieved some success in the European Touring Car Championship with Alfa Romeo and FIAT Abarth, winning the 1966 1000cc Class Championship in an Abarth 1000. After dabbling in Formula Three, he retired after a huge accident at the 1967 "Monza Lottery". Boley Pittard of England was burned severely when his Lola burst into flames at the start of the final qualifying heat. Baghetti won the event in a Branca with an average speed over thirty-five laps of  In June 1968 Baghetti was in a huge pile-up on the 23rd lap of a Formula Two race at Monza. He was driving a Dino.

He later became a journalist and photographer in motorsport and fashion, and promoted various industrial videos for Fiat.

Death and legacy
Baghetti died of cancer on 27 November 1995.

Baghetti's Championship debut win has secured him a footnote in Formula One history, as he became the only driver to have won his first three Formula One races, starting with two non-championship Grand Prix races in Italy.

Complete Formula One World Championship results
(key) (Races in italics indicate fastest lap)

Non-championship
(key) (Races in italics indicate fastest lap)

References

1934 births
1995 deaths
Italian racing drivers
Italian Formula One drivers
Ferrari Formula One drivers
Formula One race winners
Automobili Turismo e Sport Formula One drivers
Scuderia Centro Sud Formula One drivers
Reg Parnell Racing Formula One drivers
Team Lotus Formula One drivers
24 Hours of Le Mans drivers
Deaths from cancer in Lombardy
World Sportscar Championship drivers
European Touring Car Championship drivers